Special Forces is the second studio album released by American rapper Big Ed the Assassin. It was released under his new stage name Big Ed the Assassin on May 9, 2000, and it was the very first release through Big Ed's label, Special Forces Records. The album made it to #25 on Top R&B/Hip Hop Albums.

Reception
There was a music video for the single "Battlefield" which was produced by Les-G. Although not a No Limit Records album, it did feature numerous guest  appearances by his former labelmates and production by No Limit's former production team The Medicine Men (Formally Beats By the Pound). Also featured are beats from bay area producer Les-G. On October 31, 2000, a chopped and screwed version by Swishahouse was released.

Track listing

References

Big Ed the Assassin at AllMusic

2000 albums
Big Ed albums